Matías Biscay (born 5 March 1974) is a former Argentinian footballer who is currently assistant manager of River Plate.

Playing career
Biscay began his career at River Plate, playing five Primera División games and winning the 1996 Copa Libertadores, before moving to fellow Buenos Aires-based club Huracán. Biscay's stay at Huracán lasted two seasons, playing 40 times in the Primera División, scoring seven.

In 1998, Biscay moved to Europe to play for Swiss club Lugano, making seven league appearances for Lugano. In 1999, Biscay signed for Spanish club Compostela, playing 44 times in the Segunda División, scoring once. Biscay retired at the age of 28, following legal issues with Compostela.

Coaching career
In 2011, Biscay was appointed assistant manager of Uruguayan club Nacional.

In 2014, Biscay moved to former club River Plate, taking up the role of assistant manager. In 2018, following the suspension of manager Marcelo Gallardo, Biscay filled in as River Plate manager in the 2018 Copa Libertadores Finals against rivals Boca Juniors.

References

1974 births
Living people
People from San Fernando de la Buena Vista
Argentine footballers
Association football defenders
Association football midfielders
Argentine football managers
Argentine Primera División players
Segunda División players
Swiss Super League players
Club Atlético River Plate footballers
Club Atlético Huracán footballers
FC Lugano players
SD Compostela footballers
Association football coaches
Sportspeople from Buenos Aires Province